William Starr (1923-2020) was an American violinist, conductor, teacher, academic and author best known for teaching the Suzuki method in America. 

Raised in Kansas, Starr (age 17) debuted as a soloist with the Kansas City Philharmonic. Training at the Eastman School of Music, he became an academic at the University of Tennessee Department of Music, which he later chaired (1977–1982).

In the 1960s he moved to Japan to study with Shinichi Suzuki, before returning to America to bring what was then a technique relatively new to the country. Starr was a founder and first president (1972 to 1974) of the Suzuki Association of the Americas (SAA).

Books

Music

References

External links
William Starr at the American Suzuki Association
William Starr at Boulder Suzuki Strings

American male violinists
University of Tennessee faculty
Violin pedagogues
1923 births
2020 deaths
Eastman School of Music alumni